The Walker County Board of Education is the governing body over the public schools in Walker County, Alabama, United States.

Member schools

Bankhead Middle School
Carbon Hill Elementary/Junior High School
Carbon Hill High School
Cordova Elementary School
Cordova High School
Curry Elementary School
Curry Middle School
Curry High School
Dora High School
Farmstead Elementary/Junior High School
Lupton Elementary/Junior High School
Oakman Elementary School
Oakman High School
Parrish Elementary School
Sumiton Elementary/Junior High School
Townley Elementary/Junior High School
Valley Elementary/Junior High School
Walker County Alternative School
Walker County Center of Technology

Closed/Former 

 Parrish High School (closed in 2014)
 Sipsey Elementary/Junior High School (closed in 2014)
 T.S. Boyd Elementary/Junior High School (closed in 2014)

Source:

Failing schools
Statewide testing ranks the schools in Alabama. Those in the bottom six percent are listed as "failing." As of early 2018, Carbon Hill High School was included in this category.

References

External links
Official Website

School districts in Alabama
Education in Walker County, Alabama